Lawrence Ogwang (17 December 1932 – 1970s) was a Ugandan long and triple jumper. He was the brother of the Olympic athlete John Akii-Bua and was murdered during the reign of Idi Amin.

Career 
He won a gold medal in the long jump at the 1953 Central African Games.

References

1932 births
1970s deaths
Ugandan male long jumpers
Ugandan male triple jumpers
Olympic athletes of Uganda
Commonwealth Games competitors for Uganda
Athletes (track and field) at the 1956 Summer Olympics
Athletes (track and field) at the 1954 British Empire and Commonwealth Games
Athletes (track and field) at the 1958 British Empire and Commonwealth Games
Athletes (track and field) at the 1962 British Empire and Commonwealth Games
Ugandan murder victims
Male murder victims
People murdered in Uganda